Appearances: Book 1 is a compilation album by rapper Brotha Lynch Hung, released on January 19, 2002 on Black Market Records, Lynch's old label ran by Cedric Singleton. It is the first in a trilogy of compilation albums released throughout 2002. After Lynch released his second LP, Loaded, he began a long-standing feud with Cedric over the rights to his back catalogue (including 24 Deep, Season Of Da Siccness and Loaded). To compile Book 1, Cedric scraped together a lot of either stolen Lynch songs, or songs from other underground rappers' albums that featured Lynch. This is basically a bootleg; it is rumored Lynch receives no profit whatsoever on anything Black Market put out after Loaded. The vast majority of these songs came from other artists' albums: 'Tremendous' was taken from Sicx's LP, 'It's Real' came from a Mr. Serv-on album, 'Candy Wit' Slam' from Dubb Sak's LP, etc.

Tracks
 "West Coast Parley"
 "It's Real" (featuring Master P and Mr. Serv-On)
 "So Serious" (featuring Killa Tay, Marvalous and Lunasicc)
 "Tremendous" (featuring Sicx and Tall Can)
 "Holloween" (featuring Delinquents)
 "Gone Blown" (featuring Young Ridah)
 "Had To Gat Ya 2001" (featuring Young Droop)
 "Weapons Of War" (featuring First Degree, Roulette and Loki)
 "3 Da Hardway" (featuring Loki and Tre 8)
 "Sicc Wit Shit" (featuring Mr. Doctor)
 "Candy With Slam" (featuring Dubb Sack)
 "Betrayed" (featuring Sicx and Undadog)
 "Psycho Dream" (featuring Gangsta Profile)
 "None To Die For" (featuring Loki)
 "Blackula" (featuring First Degree)

2002 compilation albums
Brotha Lynch Hung albums
Gangsta rap compilation albums